Skyhawk may refer to:

Aircraft and military
 Cessna 172 Skyhawk, a single-engine, four-seat light airplane
 Douglas A-4 Skyhawk, a ground-attack jet aircraft
 Seibel S-4, a helicopter evaluated by the United States Army under the designation YH-24 Sky Hawk
 SkyHawks Parachute Team, the Canadian Forces parachute demonstration team
 Sky Hawk, an Iranian experimental air-to-air version of the MIM-23 Hawk air defense missile

Automobiles
 Buick Skyhawk, a compact car built from 1975 to 1989
 Studebaker Sky Hawk, a 1956 two-door coupe automobile

Places
 A neighborhood in Santa Rosa, California

Other uses
 Skyhawk (mascot), one of the mascots for the Atlanta Hawks professional basketball team
 Skyhawk, the mascot of Stonehill College, a Division II College in Easton, MA 
 Tennessee–Martin Skyhawks, athletic program of The University of Tennessee at Martin
 Skyhawk (Cedar Point), a flat ride at Cedar Point amusement park in Sandusky, Ohio, US
 Skyhawk (comics), a Marvel Comics character
 Sky Hawk, a 1976 electro-mechanical game by Nintendo that features 16mm film-based visuals. 
 Skyhawks (TV series), an animated cartoon television series sponsored by Mattel Toys
 Sky Hawk (manga), a Japanese manga series
 The Sky Hawk, a 1929 film

See also
 Captain Skyhawk, a video game developed by Rare for the NES
 Cessna CH-1 Skyhook, based on the Seibel S-4B